Hans Vilhelm Dopp Mandall Keilhau (18 August 1845 - 31 January 1917) was a Norwegian artillery officer and Government minister.

Keilhau was born in Bergen, Norway.  He was the son of Lt. Col. William Christian Keilhau and was raised in a military family. He passed his college exam in 1870. He became an officer in 1866, Second lieutenant in 1872, First Lieutenant in 1876, Captain in 1888, Major in 1892 and Major General in 1900. He served as Minister of Defence during the administration of Prime Minister Gunnar Knudsen (1913-1914). Keilhau resigned at the outbreak of World War I.

References

1845 births
1917 deaths
Military personnel from Bergen
Norwegian military leaders
Defence ministers of Norway